George Valera (born November 13, 2000) is an American professional baseball outfielder in the Cleveland Guardians organization.

Career
Valera was born in Queens, New York and moved to San Pedro de Macoris, Dominican Republic with his family when he was 13. He signed with the Cleveland Indians as an international free agent in July 2017.

Valera made his professional debut with the Arizona League Indians in 2018, batting .333 over six games. He started 2019 with the Mahoning Valley Scrappers and was promoted to the Lake County Captains near the season's end. Over 52 games between both teams, he batted .217 with eight home runs and 32 RBIs. He did not play a minor league game in 2020 due to the cancellation of the minor league season caused by the COVID-19 pandemic. Valera split the 2021 season between Lake County and the Akron RubberDucks, slashing .260/.405/.505 with 19 home runs, 65 RBIs, and 11 stolen bases over 86 games.

The newly named Cleveland Guardians selected Valera to their 40-man roster on November 19, 2021.

Valera was optioned to the Triple-A Columbus Clippers to begin the 2023 season.

References

External links

2000 births
Living people
African-American baseball players
Akron RubberDucks players
Arizona League Indians players
Baseball outfielders
Estrellas Orientales players
Lake County Captains players
Mahoning Valley Scrappers players
Sportspeople from Queens, New York
Baseball players from New York City